Stones for the Rampart is a 2014 Polish war drama film directed by Robert Gliński, based on the 1943 novel of the same name by Aleksander Kamiński.

Plot
"To be defeated and not to give in is a victory." Here is the motto, which in life is guided by three young friends: Alek, Zośka and Rudy. Scouts, high school graduates of Warsaw high school making ambitious plans for the future interrupted by September 1939. They enter adulthood in unusually dramatic times that put them ahead of their choice – survive at all costs or join the fighters for a free homeland, risking everything. The boys, raised in patriotic homes, shaped by scout ideals, decide to fight. They become soldiers and although they rub against death every day, they can live life to the fullest. They fight selflessly and with honor. To leave "like stones thrown at God's lair", leaving behind a great lesson of friendship, honor and love for the homeland.

Cast

 Tomasz Ziętek as Jan Bytnar
  as Tadeusz Zawadzki
  as Maciej Aleksy Dawidowski
 Danuta Stenka as Zdzisława Bytnarowa
 Artur Żmijewski as Stanisław Bytnar
 Irena Melcer as Danuta Bytnar
 Magdalena Koleśnik as Maryna Trzcińska

References

External links
 

2014 films
2014 war drama films
Films based on non-fiction books
Films based on Polish novels
Films directed by Robert Gliński
Films set in Warsaw
Films shot in Warsaw
Polish war drama films
Polish World War II films
Films about Polish resistance during World War II
2010s Polish-language films